Irina Solomonovna Levitina  (born June 8, 1954) is a former Soviet and current American chess and bridge player. In chess, she has been a World Championship Candidate in 1984 and gained the title Woman Grandmaster. In contract bridge she has won five world championship events, four women and two mixed, including play on two world-champion USA women teams.

Chess career

In 1973, she tied for 2nd–5th in Menorca (interzonal).  In 1974, she beat Valentina Kozlovskaya 6,5 : 5,5 in Kislovodsk (semifinal match). In 1975, she lost to Nana Alexandria 8 : 9 in a final match in Moscow. In 1977, she lost to Alla Kushnir 3 : 6 in a quarterfinal match in Dortmund.

In 1982, she took 2nd in Tbilisi (interzonal). In 1983, she beat Nona Gaprindashvili 6 : 4 in Lvov (quarterfinal), and Alexandria 7,5 : 6,5 in Dubna (semifinal). In 1984, she beat Lidia Semenova 7 : 5 in Sochi (final) and became World Women's Championship Challenger. Levitina lost to Maia Chiburdanidze 5½ : 8½ in a title match at Volgograd 1984.

In 1986, she took 7th in Malmö (Candidates Tournament; Elena Akhmilovskaya won). In 1987, she tied for 2nd–4th in Smederevska Palanka (interzonal). In 1988, she tied for 3rd–4th in Tsqaltubo (Candidates). In 1991, she tied for 3rd–4th in Subotica (interzonal). In 1992, she took 6th in Shanghai (Candidates; Susan Polgar won).

She was the Soviet Women's Champion four times—in 1971, 1978 (jointly), 1979, and 1981.

After her emigration in 1990 to the United States, she has also been U.S. Women's Champion in 1991 (jointly), 1992, and 1993 (jointly).

Awarded the titles of WIM in 1972, and WGM in 1976.

Bridge career

Levitina is now a professional bridge player. She has won 5 world champion titles in women's bridge and many "national" titles (major events at North American Bridge Championships, thrice-annual 10-day meets). Sometime prior to the 2014 European and World meets (summer and October), Levitina ranked 15th among 73 Women World Grand Masters by world masterpoints (MP) and 5th by placing points that do not decay over time.

In 1986, Levitina won the Alpwater Award for the best played hand of the year by a woman player, becoming the first Soviet citizen to win a bridge award.

Bridge accomplishments

Awards
 Alpwater Award 1986

Wins
 Venice Cup (1) 2007
 World Women Team Olympiad (1) 1996
 McConnell Cup (1) 2002
 World Women's Pairs (1) 2006
 Transnational Mixed Teams (1) 2000
 North American Bridge Championships (9)
 Women's Swiss Teams (3) 2001, 2005, 2007
 Women's Board-a-Match Teams (3) 2004, 2006, 2008
 Women's Knockout Teams (3) 1993, 1995, 2008
 United States Bridge Championships (5)
 Women's Team Trials (5) 1996, 2001, 2005, 2007, 2009

Runners-up
 McConnell Cup (1) 2006
 North American Bridge Championships (5)
 North American Swiss Teams (1) 1995
 Women's Swiss Teams (1) 2008
 Women's Board-a-Match Teams (1) 2001
 Women's Knockout Teams (2) 1998, 2004
 United States Bridge Championships (3)
 Women's Team Trials (3) 2000, 2004, 2008

Notable chess games
Nana G Alexandria vs Irina Levitina, Moscow cf (Women) 1975, Sicilian Defense: Kan, Knight Variation (B43), 0-1
Irina Levitina vs Goltsova, Sevastopol 1978, Sicilian Defense: Old Sicilian, General (B30), 1-0

See also
 List of Jewish chess players

References

External links

 
 
 
 
 
 Women Stars at the World Bridge Federation – with biographies (not yet Levitina, November 2014) 
 LEVITINA Irina athlete information at the 1st SportAccord World Mind Games (2011)
 Controversy over anti-Bush placard: New York Times article, The Nation website

1954 births
Living people
20th-century American women
21st-century American women
American contract bridge players
American female chess players
Chess woman grandmasters
Jewish chess players
Soviet emigrants to the United States
Soviet female chess players
Venice Cup players